Tennis at the 1999 Southeast Asian Games was held in Hassanal Bolkiah National Stadium Tennis Court, Bandar Seri Begawan, Brunei Darussalam from 8 to 14 August 1999  Tennis had team, doubles, and singles events for men and women, as well as a mixed doubles competition.

Medalists

Results

Men's team

Quarterfinals

Semifinals

Final

Women's team

Quarterfinals

Semifinals

Final

Men's singles

Women's singles

Men's doubles

Women's doubles

Mixed doubles

Medal table
Legend

References

External links
 Olympic Council of Asia

1999 Southeast Asian Games
Southeast Asian Games
1999 Southeast Asian Games